Mohr County is in Fars province, Iran. The capital of the county is the city of Mohr. At the 2006 census, the county's population was 54,094 in 10,999 households. The following census in 2011 counted 59,727 people in 14,083 households. At the 2016 census, the county's population was 64,827 in 17,262 households.

The county's main industries are based on its rich gas sources. Tabnak, Homa, Shanol, Varavi and Parsian refineries are important gas zones in this region. The climate is hot and dry.

Administrative divisions

The population history and structural changes of Mohr County's administrative divisions over three consecutive censuses are shown in the following table. The latest census shows four districts, eight rural districts, and five cities.

References

 

Counties of Fars Province